Kolah Darreh (also Romanized as Kaleh Darreh, Kolā Darreh, and Kulah Darreh) is a village in Zahray-ye Pain Rural District, in the Central District of Buin Zahra County, Qazvin Province, Iran. At the 2006 census, its population was 962, in 233 families.

References 

Populated places in Buin Zahra County